The Art Gallery Álvaro Santos (GAAS, in Portuguese: Galeria de Arte Álvaro Santos ) is a Brazilian public contemporary art  gallery founded in 1966, based in the square Olímpio Campos s/n,  in Aracaju, Sergipe.

History
The Gallery of Art Alvaro Santos was founded on September 26, 1966. At the site, previously, there was an old aquarium. The inaugural exhibition took place with 50 oils on canvas of Álvaro Santos, and the symbolic ribbon was cut by his niece, Marlene Alvarez Santos.

The gallery is an important showcase of art and culture in the city of Aracaju, with exhibitions of local artists, national and international. The gallery receives book launches, exhibitions of paintings and sculptures, as well as discussions and evening parties.

See also
 List of museums in Brazil

References

GALERIA ÁLVARO SANTOS RECEBE EXPOSIÇÃO XILOGRÁFICOS http://www.se.senac.br/
Galeria de Arte Álvaro Santos recebe obras de Luiz Neto g1.globo.com
Inscrições para exposição cultural na Galeria Álvaro Santos são abertas g1.globo.com
Galeria Álvaro Santos abre inscrições para o Salão dos Novos em Aracaju g1.globo.com
Exposição 'Aquarelas' está em cartaz na Galeria Álvaro Santos em Aracaju g1.globo.com
Galeria Álvaro Santos promove 'Coletiva Junina' em Aracaju g1.globo.com
Galeria Álvaro Santos abre inscrições para edição do Salão dos Novos
IFS disponibiliza aulas gratuitas de capoeira para alunos e público geral g1.globo.com

Art museums and galleries in Brazil
Palaces in Brazil
Museums in Sergipe
Buildings and structures in Aracaju